Sri Lanka national kabaddi team represents Sri Lanka in International Kabaddi.

Asian Games
 Kabaddi at the 1998 Asian Games: Fourth
 Kabaddi at the 2002 Asian Games: Sixth

Asian Indoor Games
 2007 - Group Stage
 2009 - Semi-final (Bronze Medal)

World Cup
 2007 Kabaddi World Cup (Standard style) - Quarter Finals.

South Asian Games
 1999 - Men - Bronze (1st International Medal for Sri Lanka) (Nilantha Weerasingha, Mangala Pushpakumara, HPMC Lakmal Somarathna, KPT Thushara, K Meegasthenna, Lalith, Indika Kumara, MLP Mendis, GG Samantha, Lalantha )
 2010 - Women - Bronze.

Beach Kabaddi(Asian Beach Games) 
 Beach kabaddi at the 2008 Asian Beach Games: Groupstage 
 Beach kabaddi at the 2010 Asian Beach Games: Groupstage 
 Beach kabaddi at the 2012 Asian Beach Games: Semi-final(Bronze medal) 
 Beach kabaddi at the 2014 Asian Beach Games: Semi-final(Bronze medal) 
 Beach kabaddi at the 2016 Asian Beach Games: Semi-final(Bronze medal)

See also
 Kabaddi at the Asian Games
 Beach kabaddi at the Asian Beach Games

References

External links
 Official website
 World Cup 2007 Results
 World cup 2004 Results

Kabaddi
National kabaddi teams
National kabaddi team